The Upper Midwest Preparedness and Emergency Response Learning Center (UMPERLC), established in May 2001 as the Iowa Center for Public Health Preparedness is a public health center at the University of Iowa College of Public Health. It is one of 14 centers across the country working to inform the public health workforce of the "skills to prepare for, promptly identify, and respond to any public health emergencies." The UMPERLC covers the states of Iowa and Nebraska, but also offers the majority of its training programs online through the Prepare Iowa Learning Management System, making them accessible to anyone wanting to take the courses. As of January 1, 2015, there were over 400 courses available online and more than 38,000 users of the Prepare Iowa LMS.

Program partners 
The Upper Midwest Preparedness and Emergency Response Learning Center and its program partners develop, deliver, and evaluate training programs for public health and emergency providers. The Center partners with the following organizations:

 Iowa Counties Public Health Association
 Iowa Department of Public Health
 Iowa Homeland Security and Emergency Management
 Iowa Primary Care Association
 Iowa State University College of Veterinary Medicine
 Iowa State University Center for Food Security and Public Health
 University of Nebraska Medical Center for Preparedness Education
 Safeguard Iowa Partnership
 State Hygienic Laboratory at the University of Iowa

References

External links 
 The Upper Midwest Preparedness and Emergency Learning Response Center
 Training Source Prepare Iowa Learning Management System
 Centers for Disease Control and Prevention
 Office of Public Health Preparedness and Response

Healthcare in Iowa
Public health organizations
Centers for Disease Control and Prevention
Organizations established in 2001